The 2005 FIA GT RAC Imola Supercar 500 was the fourth race for the 2005 FIA GT Championship season.  It took place on 29 May 2005 at Imola.

Official results

Class winners in bold.  Cars failing to complete 70% of winner's distance marked as Not Classified (NC).

Statistics
 Pole Position - #6 GLPK-Carsport - 1:45.835
 Fastest Lap - #6 GLPK-Carsport - 1:47.868
 Average Speed - 157.95 km/h

External links
 Official Results
 Race result

I
FIA GT